How The Game Go is an album by Vallejo, California rapper Jay Tee, from N2Deep/Latino Velvet.

Track listing 
"Off in the Bay"
"So Sick"
"Mack Hand" (featuring Baby Bash & Max Minelli)
"Player Status"
"In the Way of My Hustle" (featuring Young Dru)
"Sippin' on Bird"
"All I Wanted to Be"
"After 2"
"Savage Grind"
"One & Only Son"
"Slow Love"
"My Life"

Sources
[ AllMusic link]
40 Ounce Records link

Jay Tee albums
2006 albums
Gangsta rap albums by American artists